The 2005 Cincinnati Reds season was the 136th season for the franchise in Major League Baseball, and their third season at Great American Ball Park in Cincinnati. It consisted of the Reds finishing in fifth place in the National League Central Division and failing to improve on their 76–86 record from 2004. The Reds were managed by Dave Miley for most of the season, and after being fired, was followed by Jerry Narron.

The Reds missed the playoffs for the tenth straight season, tying a record set between 1980-89.

Offseason
November 15, 2004: Kenny Kelly was signed as a free agent with the Cincinnati Reds.
December 15, 2004: Dave Weathers was signed as a free agent with the Cincinnati Reds.
December 27, 2004: Eric Milton was signed as a free agent with the Cincinnati Reds.
 February 4, 2005 Barry Larkin announced his retirement.  He played all 19 seasons with the Reds.

Regular season

Season information
The Reds finished with an overall record of 73-89, 16 games under .500, and in 5th place behind the division winner, the St. Louis Cardinals.  They were 27 games behind the Cardinals in their division, and 16 games behind the second place team, the Houston Astros, the eventual National League champions.  The Reds finished 8 games behind the third place team, the Milwaukee Brewers, and 6 games behind the fourth place team, the Chicago Cubs.  The Reds were six games ahead of the last place team, the Pittsburgh Pirates.

Sean Casey led the team in batting average with an average of .312.  Adam Dunn led the team in both home runs and RBI, with 40 and 101, respectively.  Aaron Harang led the team in wins with 11. Felipe López was the only Red to make the National League All-Star team.

The Reds finished in 13th out of 16 teams in the National League in attendance. The Reds scored 820 runs and allowed 889 runs. Ken Griffey Jr. led the team in season salary at $12,500,000.

Season standings

National League Central

Record vs. opponents

Transactions
July 1, 2005: Jason Standridge was signed as a free agent with the Cincinnati Reds.
July 20, 2005: Kenny Kelly was selected off waivers by the Washington Nationals from the Cincinnati Reds.

Roster

Player stats

Batting

Starters by position 
Note: Pos = Position; G = Games played; AB = At bats; H = Hits; Avg. = Batting average; HR = Home runs; RBI = Runs batted in

Other batters 
Note: G = Games played; AB = At bats; H = Hits; Avg. = Batting average; HR = Home runs; RBI = Runs batted in

Pitching

Starting pitchers 
Note: G = Games pitched; IP = Innings pitched; W = Wins; L = Losses; ERA = Earned run average; SO = Strikeouts

Other pitchers 
Note: G = Games pitched; IP = Innings pitched; W = Wins; L = Losses; ERA = Earned run average; SO = Strikeouts

Relief pitchers 
Note: G = Games pitched; W = Wins; L = Losses; SV = Saves; ERA = Earned run average; SO = Strikeouts

Farm system

References

2005 Cincinnati Reds season at Baseball Reference
National League Central Standings on ESPN.com
Cincinnati Reds Batting Stats on ESPN.com
Cincinnati Reds Pitching Stats on ESPN.com

Cincinnati Reds seasons
Cincinnati Reds season
Cincinnati Reds